Aidan Robert Newhouse (born 23 May 1972) is an English former footballer. A forward, he scored 15 goals in 113 league games in an 11-year career in the Football League.

He began his career at Chester City, making his debut before his sixteenth birthday. He was sold on to Wimbledon for £100,000 in February 1990. He featured once in the Premier League, but was rarely used in his seven years at Selhurst Park. He spent brief periods on loan at Tranmere Rovers, Port Vale, Portsmouth, and Torquay United. He moved on to Fulham in June 1997, before being sold on to Swansea City for £30,000 four months later. He joined Brighton & Hove Albion in August 1999, being entering non-league football with Sutton United and Northwich Victoria.

Career
Newhouse was just 15 years and 350 days old when he was brought on a substitute by manager Harry McNally on the final day of the 1987–88 season in a 1–0 Third Division win for Chester City at Bury. This made him the youngest player to appear for the club in a Football League match. As a 16-year-old apprentice, Newhouse enjoyed a regular place in the Chester side during the 1988–89 season, with his first goal coming in a 3–0 win over Huddersfield Town in September 1988. By the 1989–90 season Newhouse was a member of the England youth squad and a full-time professional, and in February 1990 he moved to Wimbledon for an initial fee of £100,000. He went on to be a squad member at the 1990 UEFA European Under-18 Championship.

Newhouse managed just seven starting league appearances in as many years with the "Dons", though he did play and score in the Premier League, in a 3–2 defeat to Aston Villa at Selhurst Park on 3 October 1992. He was loaned out to Tranmere Rovers, but did not make it onto the pitch at Prenton Park. He joined Port Vale on loan in January 1994, but only made two substitute appearances under John Rudge, and did little to help the "Valiants" to promotion out of the Second Division. He was loaned out to Portsmouth in December 1994, and scored once in six First Division games. He signed on loan with Torquay United in December 1995, and scored twice in four appearances for a side that would finish the 1995–96 season bottom of the Football League.

In June 1997, Newhouse finally moved on when he joined Fulham. He scored four goals in 12 league and cup games, including three against Wycombe Wanderers in the League Cup. However four months later he signed for Swansea City, who paid Fulham £30,000 to secure his services. He made just nine appearances for the "Swans" in 1997–98 and eight appearances in 1998–99. He later was voted as the club's worst player in a FourFourTwo magazine poll.

Newhouse joined Brighton & Hove Albion in August 1999 on a monthly contract. Despite scoring twice on his debut in a 6–0 win over Mansfield Town, he played just twelve times for Brighton, and only started once. Manager Micky Adams preferred to instead utilise Darren Freeman and Gary Hart in the first half of the 1999–2000 campaign, whilst both Warren Aspinall and Lorenzo Pinamonte also joined in the autumn. In December 1999, he joined Conference club Sutton United; the club finished bottom of the Conference in 1999–2000, and were thus relegated. He returned to the Conference in 2001 with Northwich Victoria, but played just the one game before he quit to become a teacher.

Career statistics
Source:

References

1972 births
Living people
People from Wallasey
English footballers
Association football forwards
Chester City F.C. players
Wimbledon F.C. players
Tranmere Rovers F.C. players
Port Vale F.C. players
Portsmouth F.C. players
Torquay United F.C. players
Fulham F.C. players
Swansea City A.F.C. players
Brighton & Hove Albion F.C. players
Sutton United F.C. players
Northwich Victoria F.C. players
English Football League players
Premier League players
National League (English football) players
Schoolteachers from London